Tribia coronata is a species of sea snail, a marine gastropod mollusk in the family Cancellariidae, the nutmeg snails.

Description
The shell size varies between 12 mm and 15 mm

Distribution
This species is found in the Mediterranean Sea.

References

 Gofas, S.; Le Renard, J.; Bouchet, P. (2001). Mollusca, in: Costello, M.J. et al. (Ed.) (2001). European register of marine species: a check-list of the marine species in Europe and a bibliography of guides to their identification. Collection Patrimoines Naturels, 50: pp. 180–213
 Hemmen J. (2007). Recent Cancellariidae. Wiesbaden, 428pp
 Verhecken A. (2007). Revision of the Cancellariidae (Mollusca, Neogastropoda, Cancellarioidea) of the eastern Atlantic (40°N-40°S) and the Mediterranean. Zoosystema : 29(2): 281–364

External links

Cancellariidae
Gastropods described in 1835
Molluscs of the Mediterranean Sea